The J. William Fulbright Foreign Scholarship Board was established by the United States Congress for the purpose of supervising the Fulbright Program and certain programs authorized by the Fulbright-Hays Act and for the purpose of selecting students, scholars, teachers, trainees, and other persons to participate in the educational exchange programs.

Appointed by the President of the United States, the 12-member Board meets quarterly in Washington, D.C. The Board establishes worldwide policies and procedures for the Program and issues an annual report on the state of the Program. The Board maintains a close relationship with both the Bureau of Educational and Cultural Affairs (ECA) and the executive directors of all the binational Fulbright Commissions.

History 

The first board consisted of:
 Philip Willkie, attorney, Rushville, Indiana; 
 Dr. Francis S. Smyth, dean, Medical School, University of California; 
 Helen C. White, professor of English, University of Wisconsin; 
 Dr. Martin R. P. McGuire, professor of Greek and Latin, Catholic University of America; 
 Dr. Charles S. Johnson, president, Fisk University; 
 Dr. Frederick L. Hovde, president, Purdue University; 
 Col. John N. Andrews, personal representative of the administrator of Veterans Affairs; 
 Dr. Walter Johnson, chairman, Department of History, University of Chicago; 
 Russell L. Riley, director, International Educational Exchange Service; 
 Dr. Samuel M. Brownell, U.S. commissioner of education; 
 Dr. Francis J. Colligan, executive secretary of the Board of Foreign Scholarships; 
 Donald B. Lourie, undersecretary of state for administration; 
 Senator J. William Fulbright; 
 and Joseph B. Phillips, deputy assistant secretary for public affairs.

Current Board

References

Scholarships in the United States